Ondřej Žežulka (born 25 September 1998) is a professional Czech football player, currently playing for FK Viktoria Žižkov as a centre back or defensive midfielder.

Career
He made his senior league debut for Olympia Prague on 29 July 2017 in a Czech National Football League 1–0 home win against Pardubice. He scored his first goal on 12 August in their 2–2 home draw against Žižkov.

References

External links 
 Ondřej Žežulka official international statistics
 
 Ondřej Žežulka profile on the SK Slavia Prague official website

Czech footballers
Czech Republic youth international footballers
1998 births
Living people
Czech National Football League players
FK Viktoria Žižkov players
SK Slavia Prague players
FK Slavoj Vyšehrad players
Association football midfielders
Association football defenders